Vite (like "veet") is a local development server written by Evan You and used by default by the Vue project templates. It has support for TypeScript and JSX.

It monitors files as they're being edited and upon file save the web browser reloads the code being edited through a process called Hot Module Replacement (HMR) which works by just reloading the specific file being changed using ES6 modules (ESM) instead of recompiling the entire application.

Vite provides built-in support for server-side rendering (SSR). By default it listens on TCP port 5173. It is possible to configure Vite to serve content over HTTPS and proxy requests (including WebSocket) to a back-end web server (such as Apache HTTP Server or lighttpd).

See also 

 Vue

External links 
 
 
 Vite on npm

2020 software
Software using the MIT license